Hugo the Hippo is a 1975 animated film produced by the Pannónia Filmstúdió of Hungary and co-produced in the United States by Brut Productions, a division of French perfume company Faberge. It was released in Hungary in 1975 and in the United States in 1976 by 20th Century-Fox (as its first animated feature film distribution). The film was directed by William Feigenbaum and József Gémes (who directed the animation).

Plot 
The harbor of Zanzibar becomes infested with a gang of vicious sharks, which makes it impossible for trading ships to dock. In an attempt to fix the problem, the Sultan charges his advisor, Aban-Khan, to bring twelve hippos from Africa into the harbor to keep the sharks away. His idea works well enough, but once the hippos are no longer a novelty and the people no longer feed them, they begin to starve. After the hungry hippos rampage through the city looking for food, Aban-Khan brutally slaughters all the hippos except one, a little baby hippo named Hugo. Hugo escapes across the sea to the city of Dar es Salaam, on the African mainland.

A group of children, led by a farmer boy named Jorma, find Hugo and attempt to hide him as best they can, building a garden to feed and take care of him. However, Hugo is discovered, and the garden is burned by the angry parents to prevent their children wasting their time with him and neglecting their schoolwork. As a result, Hugo is forced to scavenge from the local farms for food. When Aban-Khan, still obsessed about catching Hugo, hears of the incident, he travels to Dar es Salaam and with the aid of the Sultan's court wizard converts the farm of Jorma's family into an enchanted garden filled with gigantic fruits and vegetables. Once Hugo is lured into the trap, the plants turn into bizarre monsters thirsting to kill both Hugo and Jorma, who has come to Hugo's aid. Despite their best efforts to get away, they end up overwhelmed and captured by Aban-Khan.

Hugo is put on trial for the damage his nighttime raids caused. Fortunately, the children manage to contact the Sultan, who agrees to appear in court to speak for Hugo. The ruler makes a powerfully impassioned speech about how the hippos were mistreated both by their neglect and their uncalled-for culling, which removes all doubt that Hugo is the true injured party in this affair. As a result, while Aban-Khan comes to feel the wrath of a populace's mind turning against him, Hugo is released and the children are charged by the judge to care for him for the rest of his days.

Cast and crew 
 Directors - William Feigenbaum and József Gémes
 Screenplay - Thomas Baum, William Feigenbaum and József Szalóky
 Production Design - Graham Percy

Voices

Additional English Voices
 Don Marshall

Production 
Hugo the Hippo was the first international release of a PannoniaFilm production; prior to this, they had also made Hungary's first animated feature, János Vitéz, in 1973. The film, produced over a two-year period, received funding from the Faberge company via its Brut Productions label. Its U.S. distributor, 20th Century-Fox, acquired Hugo along with two other Brut films starring Elliott Gould, Whiffs and I Will, I Will... for Now.

Home media 
After an unsuccessful box-office run, Hugo was briefly released to the American home video market in the early 1980s by Magnetic Video Corporation. It was first released on DVD in Hungary and Italy. Reviewer Phil Hall suggested that Hugo the Hippo would never get a DVD release due to its psychedelic, weird, politically incorrect and violent content. However, Warner Home Video did eventually release the film on DVD through the Warner Archive Collection on June 23, 2015.

Other media 
A version of the song The Best Day Ever Made was used in the 1988–1992 animatronic show Care Bears Care-A-Lot Castle Show which was located in Dorney Park & Wildwater Kingdom.

See also 
 List of American films of 1975
 List of animated feature-length films
 List of 20th Century Fox theatrical animated features
 Zanzibar
 Hippopotamus

References

Bibliography

External links 
 
 
 
 Official Pannoniafilm website (archived at the Wayback Machine)
 A 1966 Time article about the real Hippo (archived at the Wayback Machine)

1975 films
1975 animated films
20th Century Fox animated films
Fictional hippopotamuses
Films about sharks
Films set in Africa
Films set in Tanzania
Hungarian animated films
1970s Hungarian-language films
1970s American animated films
1970s children's animated films
1970s children's films
Hungarian children's films
20th Century Fox films